Brachypogon is a genus of flies belonging to the family Ceratopogonidae.

The genus was first described by Kieffer in 1899.

The genus has almost cosmopolitan distribution.

Species:
 Brachypogon nitidulus
 Brachypogon perpusillus
 Brachypogon sociabilis
 Brachypogon vitiosus

References

Ceratopogonidae